Pinacosuchus is an extinct genus of crocodylomorph.  Its fossils were found in the Late Cretaceous-age North Horn Formation of Utah (United States). Pinacosuchus was a diminutive crocodylomorph with spiky armor, and is known only from meagre remains.

History and description
Charles W. Gilmore named Pinacosuchus in 1942 for USNM 16592, consisting of a fragment of upper jaw, seven partial vertebrae, a partial coracoid, a partial thigh bone, numerous pieces of bony armor, and other fragments. This specimen was discovered at the "Lizard Locality" in the Manti National Forest, Emery County, Utah. The type species is P. mantiensis. Gilmore had difficulty classifying the specimen, due to its fragmentary nature.  He ruled out all then-known orders of reptiles on anatomical ground except for Crocodilia (which had a more expansive definition at the time) and the nebulous thecodontia.  He considered a pseudosuchian thecodont identity, but eliminated it because all members were of Triassic age or older.  Pinacosuchus would have been an archaic crocodilian because it lacked the procoelous vertebrae (concave articulation surface on the anterior face of the bone, and convex articulation on the posterior face) of more derived crocodilians, instead having amphicoelous vertebrae (concave articulations on both faces).

Pinacosuchus would have been a very small crocodylomorph. Gilmore regarded the specimen as an adult because the vertebrae lacked sutures for their neural arches, a sign of maturity. This assessment was supported by O'Neill and colleagues, comparing Pinacosuchus to their new spiked crocodilian Akanthosuchus. The armor of Pinacosuchus was found disarticulated. Gilmore divided the armor into five categories: simple rectangular scutes; ridged rooflike scutes; thickened rectangular scutes with asymmetrically-positioned sharp spines overhanging the borders; small pointed spines with thickened bases; and more elongate pointed spines with thickened bases. The genus is briefly mentioned in Cifelli et al. (1999) under the misspelling "Pinasuchus". In the text of this publication, it is mentioned that Kenneth Carpenter had observed "some faint resemblances" to the Morrison Formation goniopholidid genus Eutretauranosuchus. It is incorrectly listed as a possible ankylosaur in Table 1.

References

Late Cretaceous crocodylomorphs of North America
Late Cretaceous reptiles of North America
Prehistoric pseudosuchian genera